Neil Carter may refer to:

Neil Carter (cricketer) (born 1975), South African cricketer
Neil Carter (political scientist), British social scientist at the University of York
Neil Carter (musician) (born 1958), former rhythm guitarist and keyboardist for the British rock band UFO and guitarist Gary Moore
Neil Carter (The Archers), a character from the British radio soap opera The Archers